"Supergirl" (sometimes stylized as "SuperGirl") is a song written by Marti Dodson and Mats Valentin and recorded by American rock band Saving Jane for their 2008 album of the same name. It was released as the album's lead single on March 25, 2008.

Use in popular culture
During the summer of 2008, "SuperGirl" became the theme song of two prominent athletes, racecar driver Danica Patrick and Olympic Gold Medal gymnast Nastia Liukin.

Commercial performance
The single entered the Billboard Pop 100, becoming the group's second entry after "Girl Next Door (2005)". On the chart dated June 21, 2008, the song debuted at number 95, becoming one of eighteen new entries that week. The track began slowly ascending the chart in June and July, entering the top 90 in its fifth week on, and eventually attaining a peak of number 85 on the chart dated August 2, 2008. It spent a total of eleven weeks in the top 100, exiting the chart at the end of August.

Chart performance

Suzie McNeil version

In 2009, Canadian pop rock singer Suzie McNeil recorded a cover of "Supergirl" for Rock-n-Roller: Reloaded (2009), the re-issue of her second studio album, Rock-n-Roller. It was released in Canada as the lead single for Rock-n-Roller: Reloaded (and second single from the album overall, following "Let's Go") on March 24, 2009, and internationally on August 18, 2009. "Supergirl" entered the Canadian Hot 100 at No. 80.

Music video
The video for "Supergirl" was directed by Carlos Lopez Estrada and premiered June 24, 2009 on McNeil's official YouTube channel. In it, McNeil portrays a vigilante-superheroine character who saves various men from compromising positions as well as performing with her band on a stage lit by multi-colored, nightclub-inspired lights.

Chart performance

Weekly charts

Year-end charts

Release history

References

2008 songs
2008 singles
2009 singles
Universal Music Group singles
Saving Jane songs